"Feel Right" is a song recorded by British record producer Mark Ronson, with vocals from American rapper Mystikal, for Ronson's fourth studio album, Uptown Special (2015). It was later released as the album's second single in the United Kingdom, and the third official single overall, on 29 March 2015.

Music video 
The official audio for the single was uploaded to Vevo on 24 November 2014. The music video, co-directed by Cameron Duddy and Bruno Mars, premiered on Ronson's Vevo channel on 10 May 2015. The video takes place during a school talent show set in the fictional Sunnydale High, with actress Florence Henderson making an appearance to announce the band Uptown Special. Mars, Mystikal and Ronson appear in the video as judges of the show.

Live performances
On 22 November 2014, Ronson first performed the song live on Saturday Night Live, with Mystikal making an appearance and Bruno Mars doing background vocals. On 10 February 2015, Ronson and Mystikal performed the track with The Roots on The Tonight Show with Jimmy Fallon.

Track listing
CD single
"Feel Right"  – 3:42

Charts

Weekly charts

References

2015 singles
2015 songs
Songs written by Mark Ronson
Songs written by Philip Lawrence (songwriter)
Songs written by Bruno Mars
Songs written by Mystikal
Songs written by Christopher Brody Brown
Songs written by Thomas Brenneck
Songs written by Nick Movshon